Luca Moscatiello (born 25 May 1991 in Italy) is an Italian footballer.

References

Italian footballers
Living people
1991 births
Association football midfielders
KF Teuta Durrës players